Teisko Airfield is an airfield in the Velaatta village (in the former municipality of Teisko) in Tampere, Finland. The airfield was completed in 1983, and it is owned by the City of Tampere and operated by Tampereen Vauhtipuisto ry. Gliding and motor gliding activities have been practiced in the field.

See also
List of airports in Finland

References

External links
 VFR Suomi/Finland – Teisko Airfield
 Lentopaikat.net – Teisko Airfield 

Airports in Finland
Buildings and structures in Tampere